Elena Cîlcic (born 3 June 1996) is a Moldovan weightlifter. She won the silver medal in the women's 87kg event at the 2021 European Weightlifting Championships held in Moscow, Russia.

Career 

She won the bronze medal in the under-23 women's 75kg event at the 2018 European Junior & U23 Weightlifting Championships held in Zamość, Poland. In 2019, she won the gold medal in the under-23 women's 87kg event at the European Junior & U23 Weightlifting Championships in Bucharest, Romania.

She also competed in the women's 81 kg event at the 2018 World Weightlifting Championships held in Ashgabat, Turkmenistan and in the women's 87 kg event at the 2019 World Weightlifting Championships held in Pattaya, Thailand.

In 2020, she won the silver medal in the women's 87kg event at the Roma 2020 World Cup in Rome, Italy.

She represented Moldova at the 2020 Summer Olympics in Tokyo, Japan. She finished in 8th place in the women's 87 kg event.

Major results

References

External links 
 

Living people
1996 births
Place of birth missing (living people)
Moldovan female weightlifters
European Weightlifting Championships medalists
Weightlifters at the 2020 Summer Olympics
Olympic weightlifters of Moldova
21st-century Moldovan women